Holy Family Academy is a co-educational private junior high / high school in Manchester, New Hampshire, teaching in the Roman Catholic classical tradition.  In September, 2006, the school was named in the Catholic High School Honor Roll, which lists the top 50 Catholic high schools in the United States. It is independently operated within the Roman Catholic Diocese of Manchester.

Holy Family Academy was founded by a group of parents in 2000. It serves students from the seventh through twelfth grade and employs the Socratic method of teaching.

The school is accredited by the National Association of Private Catholic and Independent Schools (NAPCIS).

References

External links

 School website
 National Association of Private Catholic and Independent Schools

Roman Catholic Diocese of Manchester
Schools in Manchester, New Hampshire
Catholic secondary schools in New Hampshire
Educational institutions established in 2000
2000 establishments in New Hampshire